George Rainer Siber (born September 7, 1944) is a medical researcher and vaccine expert with  years of experience in developing numerous vaccines, therapeutic antibodies, and diagnostic agents for infectious diseases.

Siber is a former Harvard professor, current adjunct professor at Johns Hopkins University and professor at the University of Massachusetts Medical School, former executive vice president and chief science officer of Wyeth, and advisory committee member of the World Health Organization, US National Institutes of Health, Gates Foundation, and the National Institute of Allergy and Infectious Diseases.

Biography

Early life and education
Siber emigrated from Bavaria, Germany, with his parents at age nine in 1953 to Montreal.  At the time, he spoke no English.  Later, he attended Chambly Academy, where he graduated in 1962.  It was at Chambly, which later become Penfield Academy, that Siber was convinced by Wilder Penfield to pursue a career in medicine.

After high school, he attended Bishop's University in Lennoxville, Quebec from 1962 to 1966, where he graduated with honors and obtained a Bachelor of Science.  Siber then attended McGill University in Montreal, Quebec, Canada, where he became a Doctor of Medicine in 1970.  It was during this time that Siber published research he completed at the Montreal Neurological Institute.

Siber is both a US and Canadian citizen.  He has homes in Manhattan and Beijing.

Interships, residencies, and fellowships
After graduation in 1970, Siber held several internships, residencies, and fellowships.  Between 1970 and 1972, Siber worked in Chicago as an intern and junior medical resident at Rush University Medical Center.  In 1972, Siber moved to Boston and worked as a senior medical resident and clinical fellow in medicine at Beth Israel Hospital until 1973.  Between 1973 and 1975, Siber worked as a clinical fellow in infectious diseases and research fellow in medicine at Beth Israel Hospital, Boston Children's Hospital, and Harvard Medical School.  Between 1974 and 1975, Siber was also a fellow for the Medical Research Council of Canada.

Professional experience

Industry appointments
Siber has held several industry appointments for various companies since the mid-1990s.

Siber served as the vice president, chief scientific officer, and senior vice president, and executive vice president for Wyeth from 1996 to 2006.

Siber oversaw the development and approval of several vaccines for Wyeth: including Prevnar pneumococcal vaccine; Acel-Imune acellular pertussis vaccine; Meningitec meningococcal meningitis vaccine; Rotashield rotavirus vaccine; and, FluMist influenza vaccine.

Since retiring from Wyeth Siber has served on the boards of directors of several companies, Since 2007, Siber has served as the executive chairman (until 2013) and as executive director and chairman of the scientific advisory board for Genocea Biosiences in Cambridge, Massachusetts. In 2009 he was appointed as the director of Selecta Biosciences in Watertown, Massachusetts. In 2012 he joined the board of directors and SAB of Vedantra Parmaceutcals and the board of Huamei Biotechnologies, also known as Sino-American Biotechnology Company (SABC), in Luoyang, China. In 2014 he co-founded Affinivax and serves on the board of directors.

Siber joined ClearPath Vaccine Company in 2012 and became its chief scientific officer in 2013.

Siber was appointed to the board of trustees of the International Vaccine Institute in Korea in 2014 and chairs the board's science committee.

Siber has served on numerous scientific advisory committees, including Variation Biotechnologies in Cambridge (2008–09), Ligocyte Pharmaceuticals in Bozeman, Missouri (2008–12), Ancora Pharmaceuticals Medford, Massachusetts (2008–12), Prothena Biosciences (previously Neotope) in San Francisco (2009–present), Visterra Inc in Cambridge (2011–14), AbVitro in Boston (2013–present), Vaxess in Cambridge (2014 – present) PaxVax in San Diego (2014–2018), and Veritas Gene (2014–present). Siber also serves on the external advisory board of Aditec on behalf of the EC (2009–present), the Korean FDA, (2011–present) and the Vaccine Advisory Committee of the Wistar Institute in Philadelphia (2012–present).

Department of Public Health appointments
Siber served as the assistant director and head of bacterial vaccines for the Massachusetts Public Health Biological Laboratories in Jamaica Plain, Massachusetts, between 1982 and 1983.  In 1983, he was promoted to the position of director, where he served until 1996.

Academic appointments
Since 1975, Siber has held several academic appointments and teaching positions.

Siber has held positions at Harvard Medical School (associate professor until 1996), Tufts University School of Medicine, University of Massachusetts Medical School (professor of medicine until 2012), and the Johns Hopkins Bloomberg School of Public Health (adjunct professor from 2008 to present).

Between 1975 ad 1996, Siber held several hospital appointments at various hospitals, including Beth Israel Hospital, the Dana–Farber Cancer Institute, Brigham and Women's Hospital, Newton-Wellesley Hospital, Mouth Auburn Hospital, Harvard University Health Services, and the Children's Hospital.  He served as an assistant physician, associate in medicine, and as courtesy staff across those locations.

Products developed and licenses for marketing and sale
Siber has been directly involved in the creation of several products, most of which were created while working for Wyeth and Mass Biologics.

Siber holds patents on Bactogen, a diagnostic kit for bacterial meningitis, RespiGam, the first Human respiratory syncytial virus immune globulin, and Prevnar, the first Pneumococcal Pneumonia Conjugate.

Respigam was the first antibody licensed for preventing severe RSV infections in high-risk infants and was the precursor product to Synagis, the first human monoclonal antibody for infectious diseases. Prevnar 7 and 13 are for the prevention of pneumococcal infections, the most common and severe bacterial infection of children and elderly adults worldwide causing mortality exceeding 1 million per year. Prevnar is also the most successful commercial vaccine of all time with sales exceeding four billion dollars per year.

Siber also developed Cytogam, the first Cytomegalovirus immune Globulin, BabyBIG, the first infant botulism immune globulin, the Haemophilus influenzae conjugate vaccine in Quinvaxim licensed to Berna, Acellimune, an Acellular pertussis combination vaccine, Meningitex, the first Meningoccus C conjugate vaccine, Rotashield, the first Rotavirus diarrhea vaccine, and FluMist, the first Live attenuated influenza vaccine.

Siber became a diplomate with the National Board of Medical Examiners in 1971, a diplomate with the American Board of Internal Medicine in 1973, and a diplomate in infectious diseases for the American Board of Internal Medicine.

Awards 
1962-1966 – Domtar Scholar, Bishop's University, Lennoxville, Quebec, Canada
1966-1970 – University Scholar, McGill University, Montreal, Quebec, Canada
1968–present – Alpha Omega Alpha
1970 – Holmes Gold Medal, McGill University, Montreal, Quebec, Canada
1970 – J. Francis Williams Scholarship in Clinical Medicine, McGill University, Montreal, Quebec, Canada
1971 – Rush Medical College Award, Rush-Presbyterian-St. Luke's Hospital, Chicago, Illinois (Best Medical Intern)
1972 – Department of Medicine Award, Rush-Presbyterian-St. Luke's Hospital, Chicago, Illinois (Best Medical Resident)
1975 – Canadian MRC Fellowship in Infectious Diseases
2008 – Dedication of Massachusetts Biologic Laboratories Research and Development Building, Mattapan, MA to George R. Siber and Jeanne Leszczynsky
2016 – Albert B. Sabin Gold Medal

References

Bibliography

Journals

Long, D, M. Skoberne, T. M. Gierahn, S. Larson, J. A. Price, V. C, A. E. Baccari, K P. Cohane, D. Garvie, G. R. Siber, and J. B. Flechtner,.  Identification of novel virus-specific antigens by CD4+ and CD8+ T cells from asymptomatic HSV-2 seropositive and seronegative donors. Manuscript submitted, Virology 2014.

Books

External links 
George Siber's LinkedIn Profile

1944 births
Living people
Vaccinologists
American immunologists
Canadian immunologists
American virologists
American infectious disease physicians
Canadian infectious disease physicians
Harvard Medical School faculty
Tufts University faculty
Johns Hopkins University faculty
Bishop's University alumni
McGill University Faculty of Medicine alumni
People from Boston
Bavarian emigrants to the United States